is a landlocked prefecture of Japan located in the Kantō region of Honshu. Saitama Prefecture has a population of 7,338,536 (1 January 2020) and has a geographic area of 3,797 km2 (1,466 sq mi). Saitama Prefecture borders Tochigi Prefecture and Gunma Prefecture to the north, Nagano Prefecture to the west, Yamanashi Prefecture to the southwest, Tokyo to the south, Chiba Prefecture to the southeast, and Ibaraki Prefecture to the northeast.

Saitama is the capital and largest city of Saitama Prefecture, with other major cities including Kawaguchi, Kawagoe, and Tokorozawa. Saitama Prefecture is part of the Greater Tokyo Area, the most populous metropolitan area in the world, and many of its cities are described as bedroom communities and suburbs of Tokyo with many residents commuting into the city each day.

History 

According to Sendai Kuji Hongi (Kujiki), Chichibu was one of 137 provinces during the reign of Emperor Sujin. Chichibu Province was in western Saitama.

The area that would become Saitama Prefecture in the 19th century is part of Musashi Province in the Ritsuryō (or ryō-system; ritsu stands for the penal code, ryō for the administrative code) Imperial administration of antiquity (see Provinces of Japan and the 5 (go) capital area provinces (ki)/7 (shichi) circuits (dō) system) which was nominally revived in the Meiji restoration but has lost much of its administrative function since the Middle Ages. Saitama District (Saitama-gun) was one of Musashi's 21 ritsuryō districts.

In the fifth year of the Keiun era (708), deposits of copper were reported to have been found in the Chichibu District of what is now Saitama Prefecture.

The Saitama area was historically known as a fertile agricultural region which produced much of the food for the Kantō region. During the Edo period, many fudai daimyōs ruled small domains within the Saitama area.

At the end of the early modern Edo period, large parts of present-day Saitama were part of the shogunate domain (baku-ryō) or the often subsumed holdings of smaller vassals (hatamoto-ryō) around Edo, major areas were part of the fiefdoms (-han) Kawagoe (ruled by Matsui/Matsudaira, fudai), Oshi (Okudaira-Matsudaira, fudai) and Iwatsuki (Ōoka, fudai); few territories were held by domains seated in other provinces.

In the Meiji Restoration, after being briefly united with other rural shogunate territories in Musashi under Musashi governors (Musashi chikenji), many former shogunate/hatamoto territories in Northwestern Musashi became Ōmiya Prefecture (大宮県, Ōmiya-ken), soon renamed to Urawa (浦和県, -ken) in 1868/69, with some territories held by other short-lived prefectures (/later mainly Gunma and /later mainly Shizuoka, Kanagawa and Tokyo). In the replacement of -han with -ken, the associated territorial consolidation (removal of feudal era ex-/enclaves) and first wave of prefectural mergers in 1871/72, Oshi and Iwatsuki prefectures were merged into Urawa; after consolidation, it consisted of the entire Saitama District and Northern parts of Adachi and Katsushika (But at that time, "major and minor districts", 大区, daiku and 小区, shōku, served as administrative subdivisions) and was renamed to Saitama. The government of the prefecture was to be set up in Iwatsuki Town, Saitama District in November 1871 by the Dajōkan ordinance to set up the prefecture, but ultimately remained in Urawa's previous prefectural government seat in Urawa Town in Adachi District.

Kawagoe Prefecture was consolidated with other territories into  (入間県, Iruma-ken; government seat unchanged from Kawagoe domain/prefecture: Kawagoe Town, Iruma District) which consisted of 13 districts of Musashi in the Western part of present-day Saitama. In 1873, Iruma was merged with Gunma (capital: Takasaki Town, Gunma District) to become Kumagaya (capital: Kumagaya Town, Ōsato District). But Kumagaya was split up again in 1876: The area of Kōzuke province came back as a second Gunma prefecture, and the territories in Musashi province/former Iruma prefecture were merged into Saitama. Except for the transfer of a few municipalities to Tokyo in the 1890s/1900s (see below) and several smaller, 20th century changes through cross-prefectural municipal mergers or transfers of neighbourhoods, Saitama had reached its present extent.

In the modern reactivation of districts as administrative unit in 1878/79, Saitama was subdivided into originally 18 districts based on the ancient divisions of Musashi, but with only nine (joint) district government offices, and the number of districts was formally merged down to nine in 1896/97: North Adachi, Iruma, Hiki, Chichibu, Kodama, Ōsato, North Saitama, South Saitama, and North Katsushika. Niikura (also known as Niiza, Shiki or Shiragi), one of the original 1878/79 modern districts, was first merged into North Adachi in 1896, but a substantial part of its former territory was subsequently transferred to the North Tama and North Toshima districts of Tokyo. In the creation of modern cities, towns and villages in 1889, these districts were subdivided into originally 40 towns and 368 villages. The first city in Saitama was only established in 1922 when Kawagoe Town from Iruma District became Kawagoe City. The prefectural capital, Urawa in North Adachi, remained a town until 1934. After the Great Shōwa mergers of the 1950s, the number of municipalities in Saitama had shrunk to 95, including 23 cities by then. The Great Heisei mergers of the 2000s pushed the number below 70.

After World War II, as Tokyo expanded rapidly and modern transportation allowed longer commutes, the lack of available land in Tokyo led to the rapid development of Saitama Prefecture, where the population has nearly tripled since 1960. Most of the cities in the prefecture are closely connected to downtown Tokyo by metropolitan rail, and operate largely as residential and commercial suburbs of Tokyo.

In 2001, Urawa City was merged with Ōmiya City and Yono City to create Saitama City (Saitama-shi; but unlike the district or the prefecture written with Kana) as the new enlarged capital. It became the prefecture's first (and so far only) designated major city in 2003.

Geography 

Saitama Prefecture is bordered by Tokyo, Chiba, Ibaraki, Tochigi, Gunma, Nagano, and Yamanashi Prefectures. It is located central-west of the Kanto region, measuring 103 km from east to west and 52 km from north to south.  At 3,797.75 km2, it ranks as the ninth-smallest prefecture. The eastern border with Chiba Prefecture is defined by the Edo River. The northern and north-western border lines with Gunma Prefecture are marked by the Tone River and the Kanagawa River and the drainage divides of the Arakawa River and Kanagawa River. The southwestern border is defined by the drainage divides of the Arakawa River, Tama River, and Fuefuki River. The eastern section of the southern border line, however, does not overlap with any geological feature.

The topography of Saitama Prefecture is largely divided by the Hachiōji Tectonic Line, which runs through Kodama, Ogawa, and Hannō, into the western mountain area and the eastern lowland area. The altitude, highest on the western side, gradually lowers eastward from mountain ranges to hills to plateaus to lowlands. The eastern lowlands and plateaus occupy 67.3% of the area.

The eastern side, part of the Kantō Plain, can be further divided into nine separate expanses of hills and ten plateaus.  The former occupy small areas neighboring the Kantō Mount Range, including the Hiki Hills and Sayama Hills. The latter are mainly surrounded by alluvial flood plains. In the southeastern portion of the prefecture, the Ōmiya Plateau stands in a southeastward direction, sandwiched by the Furutone River to the east and the Arakawa River to the west.

The western side of the prefecture belongs to the Kantō Mountain Range with Chichibu Basin located in its center. The area to the west of the basin features high peaks such as Mount Sanpō (2,483 m; 三宝山, Sanpō-yama according to the GSI, but often read Sanpō-zan) on the Western border with Nagano, Saitama's highest mountain, and Mount Kōbushi (2,475 m), in which the Arakawa River has its source. Most of the land is contained in Chichibu Tama Kai National Park. The area to east of the basin consists of relatively low mountains.

Cities 

Forty cities are located in Saitama Prefecture:

Ageo
Asaka
Chichibu
Fujimi
Fujimino
Fukaya
Gyōda
Hannō
Hanyū
Hasuda
Hidaka
Higashimatsuyama
Honjō
Iruma
Kasukabe
Kawagoe
Kawaguchi
Kazo
Kitamoto
Kōnosu
Koshigaya
Kuki
Kumagaya
Misato
Niiza
Okegawa
Saitama (capital)
Sakado
Satte
Sayama
Shiki
Shiraoka
Sōka
Toda
Tokorozawa
Tsurugashima
Wakō
Warabi
Yashio
Yoshikawa

Towns and villages 

These are the towns and villages in each district:

Chichibu District
Higashichichibu
Minano
Nagatoro
Ogano
Yokoze

Hiki District
Hatoyama
Kawajima
Namegawa
Ogawa
Ranzan
Tokigawa
Yoshimi

Iruma District
Miyoshi
Moroyama
Ogose
Kitaadachi District
Ina
Kitakatsushika District
Matsubushi
Sugito

Kodama District
Kamikawa
Kamisato
Misato
Minamisaitama District
Miyashiro
Ōsato District
Yorii

Mergers

Transportation 
Radial transportation to and from Tokyo dominates transportation in the prefecture. Circular routes were constructed as bypasses to avoid congestion in central Tokyo.

Roads 
The Jōban, Kan-etsu, Shuto, Tōhoku, and Tokyo-Gaikan expressways form parts of the nationwide expressway network. National highway Routes 4, 16, and 17 are important routes in Kantō region.

Railways 
Ōmiya Station in Saitama City forms East Japan Railway Company's northern hub station in the Greater Tokyo Area, offering transfers to and from Shinkansen high-speed lines. The Musashino serves as a freight bypass line as well as a passenger line.
Chichibu Railway the northwestern,
Seibu Railway the southwestern,
Tobu Railway the midwestern and the eastern,
the New Shuttle and Saitama Railway the southeastern
parts of the prefecture respectively.
The Tsukuba Express line crosses the southeastern corner of the prefecture.
East Japan Railway Company
Tōhoku Shinkansen
Jōetsu Shinkansen
Utsunomiya Line (Tōhoku Main Line)
Takasaki Line
Shōnan-Shinjuku Line
Keihin-Tōhoku Line
Saikyō Line
Musashino Line
Kawagoe Line
Hachikō Line
Tobu
Isesaki Line
Tojo Line
Nikko Line
Noda Line
Skytree Line
Seibu
Ikebukuro Line
Shinjuku Line
Chichibu Line
Sayama Line
Tokyo Metro
Fukutoshin Line
Yurakucho Line
Tsukuba Express
Saitama Rapid Railway Line
Chichibu Railway
Chichibu Mainline
Mikajiri Line

People movers
Saitama New Urban Transit (New Shuttle)
Seibu Yamaguchi Line (Leo Liner)

Airports 
Haneda Airport and Narita International Airport are the closest major civil airports. Commuter helicopter flights from Kawajima to Narita Airport are offered.

Honda Airport for general aviation, and the JASDF's Iruma Air Base and Kumagaya Air Base.

Waterways 
Rivers and canals, including those developed in the Edo period (17th – 19th centuries) in the east of the prefecture, are largely disused following the introduction of motorised land transport. Traces of water transport are found on the Tone River, which forms the border between Saitama and Gunma Prefecture, and on the Arakawa River, which includes a tourist attraction in Nagatoro.

Culture

Mass media 
See Mass media in Saitama Prefecture.

Politics and government 

Like all prefectural administrations, Saitama's is headed by a governor ([ken-]chiji) who is directly elected to four-year terms since 1947. The current incumbent is Motohiro Ōno, a former DPFP member of the Diet who was elected in August 2019 with centre-left support (CDP, DPFP, SDP) and 47.9% of the vote against centre-right supported (LDP, Kōmeitō) former baseball player Kenta Aoshima (44.9%) and three other candidates.

Also as in all prefectures, prefectural by-laws, the budget and the approval of important prefectural administrative appointments such as the vice-governors or members of the public safety commission, are the prerogative of the assembly which is elected directly to four-year terms on an independent electoral cycle. That may or may not be synchronized with the gubernatorial term; currently, it is not, as it is still part of the unified local election cycle (Saitama gubernatorial elections already left the unified cycle in 1949). In the last round in April 2019, the LDP maintained its outright majority with 48 of the 93 seats in the assembly. As in most prefectures, the Saitama assembly was established legally in 1878 and first convened 1879.

In the National Diet, Saitama's directly elected delegation consists of 15 members of the House of Representatives and currently seven (four per class, but only raised from three in 2019, so it will only grow to eight after the 2022 election) in the House of Councillors. The latest prefecture-wide election was the House of Councillors by-election in October 2019 to fill the seat vacated by Motohiro Ōno; it was won by the previous governor Kiyoshi Ueda who has a centre-left background (DPJ member of the House of Representatives for Saitama's 4th district before his term as governor), but without full-scale party backing and without any other major party-backed candidate in the race.

List of governors since 1947

Sister relationships 
Saitama Prefecture has a number of sister city relationships with states and a province as listed below (in chronological order).
 Mexico State, Mexico, affiliated on October 2, 1979
 Shanxi province, China, affiliated on October 27, 1982
 Queensland, Australia, affiliated on October 27, 1984
 Ohio, United States, affiliated on October 22, 1990
 Brandenburg, Germany, affiliated on August 26, 1998

Sports 

The sports teams listed below are based in Saitama.

Football (soccer) 
Urawa Red Diamonds  (Saitama)
Omiya Ardija  (Saitama)

Baseball
Saitama Seibu Lions  (Tokorozawa)

Basketball
Koshigaya Alphas (Koshigaya)
Saitama Broncos  (Tokorozawa)

Volleyball
Takefuji Bamboo  (Kitakatsushika District)

Rugby
Secom Rugguts  (Sayama)

Tourism 
Most of the popular tourist sites in Saitama are located in the northwestern part of the prefecture, which is known as the Chichibu Region. This region mostly consists of a hilly and moderately mountainous area, and is situated in a rich natural environment. The region is very popular among residents of Saitama and neighboring prefectures for short trips, as it is easily accessible via the railroad network.

Visitor attractions 

 Chichibu 34 Kannon Sanctuary
 Chichibu Shrine
 Gyoda City Provincial Museum
 Iwatsuki Doll Museum
 Railway Museum (Saitama)

 Kitain Temple
 Omiya Bonsai Village
 Saitama New Urban Center
 Saitama Super Arena
 Sakitama Hill

Mascot 
 is the prefectural mascot, a Eurasian collared dove, which is also the prefectural bird. Kobaton was made originally as the mascot of the fifty-ninth annual national athletic meeting held in the prefecture in 2004, and was inaugurated as mascot of the prefecture in 2005 with an inauguration ceremony and a letter of appointment from the governor. A wheelchair-using version of Kobaton also exists.

See also
 Saitama Bank
 Sayama Tea, a tea variety grown in Saitama prefecture
Thirteen Buddhas of Chichibu
 One-Punch Man
 Mayu Watanabe

References

Citations

Sources 
 Nussbaum, Louis-Frédéric and Käthe Roth. (2005). Japan encyclopedia. Cambridge: Harvard University Press. ; OCLC 58053128

External links 

Saitama Prefecture Official Website 
Saitama Prefecture Official Website 

 
Kantō region
Prefectures of Japan